Cristian Ernesto Alessandrini (born 27 May 1985) is an Argentine footballer who plays as a forward.

Career
While playing for Nacional Potosí, Alessandrini was one of the top goal-scorers in the Liga de Fútbol Profesional Boliviano.

References

External links

 Profile at BDFA 

1985 births
Living people
Argentine footballers
Footballers from Buenos Aires
Association football forwards
A.D. Berazategui footballers
Unión San Felipe footballers
Cobreloa footballers
Asociación Social y Deportiva Justo José de Urquiza players
Club Atlético San Miguel footballers
Boyacá Chicó F.C. footballers
Argentino de Quilmes players
Carabobo F.C. players
Nacional Potosí players
Once Caldas footballers
Atlético Venezuela C.F. players
Cusco FC footballers
Club San José players
C.D.S. Vida players
Primera B Metropolitana players
Primera C Metropolitana players
Primera D Metropolitana players
Chilean Primera División players
Primera B de Chile players
Categoría Primera A players
Venezuelan Primera División players
Bolivian Primera División players
Peruvian Primera División players
Liga Nacional de Fútbol Profesional de Honduras players
Argentine expatriate footballers
Expatriate footballers in Chile
Argentine expatriate sportspeople in Chile
Expatriate footballers in Colombia
Argentine expatriate sportspeople in Colombia
Expatriate footballers in Venezuela
Argentine expatriate sportspeople in Venezuela
Expatriate footballers in Bolivia
Argentine expatriate sportspeople in Bolivia
Expatriate footballers in Peru
Argentine expatriate sportspeople in Peru
Expatriate footballers in Honduras
Argentine expatriate sportspeople in Honduras